

May

 3 May 1943 - First ever secondary school and library are opened in the Territory by Thomas Dixon Green, the inaugural principal.

Footnotes

 
1940s in the British Virgin Islands
British Virgin Islands